Ha da venì... don Calogero! is a 1952 Italian comedy film.

Premise
A priest inherits a large sum of money from a former student at his elementary school and must decide how to use it best.

Cast
Barry Fitzgerald - don Calogero Mazzoni
Lauro Gazzolo - Evaristo, il farmacista
Lois Maxwell - la maestrina
Arturo Bragaglia - il messo comunale
Charles Fawcett - Don Andrea
Una O'Connor - Angelica, la perpetua
Cesare Fantoni - il disoccupato
Rietta Medin - la sua moglie
Giorgio Capecchi - il signor Ernesto
Carlo De Santis - Alessio
Silvana Muzi - Rosetta, la sua fidanzata
Marcello Giorda - il sindaco
Franco Corsaro - Leonida, il barista
Guido Riccioli - Giovanni, il calzolaio
Loris Gizzi - il dottore
Franco Scandurra - l'avvocato
Mirco Corongiu - Francesco Cesaroni, l'allievo
Roberto Onorati - un secondo allievo
Tina Pica

External links
 

1952 films
1950s Italian-language films
Italian comedy films
1952 comedy films
Italian black-and-white films
1950s Italian films